A broad-spectrum chemokine inhibitor or BSCI (also termed chemotide or  somatotaxin ) is a type of experimental anti-inflammatory drug that inhibits the action of the pro-inflammatory proteins chemokines.

Early peptides
The observation that the chemokine CCL2 is potentially responsible for the recruitment of macrophages to atherosclerotic lesions initiated a campaign of research into the a class of molecules that would inhibit the trafficking of leukocytes and act as a new generation of anti-inflammatory agents. ‘Peptide 3’, a dodecapeptide section of CCL2, designed as an allosteric inhibitor of MCP-1 induced leukocyte chemotaxis, was quickly shown by  leukocyte migration assay to be a functional inhibitor of many chemokines in vitro with similar potency. The potency of this peptide could be increased by cyclisation and the use of the reverse sequence of D-amino acids. This peptide is called NR58-3.14.3.

In vivo anti-inflammatory activity
The cyclic peptide NR58-3.14.3 was shown to be a powerful anti-inflammatory agent in vivo, inhibiting inflammation in a number of disease models such as atherosclerosis, ischemia, lung disease, surgical adhesions, endometriosis and pulmonary graft-versus-host disease. It has been suggested that blockage of chemokine function using these molecules should not have a detrimental toxicological effect.

Anti-HIV activity
Cyclic peptide NR58-3.14.3 has also been shown to inhibit HIV replication.

Small molecule drug candidates
The key amino acids of the BSCI peptides required for activity have been identified, and the tripeptide AcNH-Trp-Val-Gln-OH was shown to itself be a BSCI in the low micromolar range. Based on this structure a number of peptide mimetics were designed, including a range of 3-acylaminoglutarimides, with low nanomolar BSCI potencies. The search for increased stability and potency led to the development of 3-acylaminolactams, with picomolar potencies in vitro and high anti-inflammatory activity in vivo. A small molecule member of this class of BSCIs called FX125L, under development by Funxional Therapeutics, has recently completed phase 1 clinical trials.

References

External links
 Funxional Therapeutics Ltd
 Broad-Spectrum Chemokine Inhibitors (BSCIs)

Anti-inflammatory agents